Liivi Sõrmus (born 17 February 1992) is an Estonian footballer who plays as a midfielder and has appeared for the Estonia women's national team.

Career
Sõrmus has been capped for the Estonia national team, appearing for the team during the 2019 FIFA Women's World Cup qualifying cycle.

In 2018, she moved from Pärnu JK to FC Kirkop United in Malta.

References

External links
 

 
 

1992 births
Living people
Sportspeople from Pärnu
Estonian women's footballers
Estonia women's international footballers
Women's association football midfielders
Expatriate footballers in Malta
Estonian expatriate sportspeople in Malta
Estonian expatriate footballers
Pärnu JK players